Ferdows Garden is a historical complex located in the district of Tajrish in Shemiran (northern Tehran), Iran.

The complex dates back to the reign of the Qajar dynasty, and includes a mansion which houses the Cinema Museum of Iran since 2009.

Etymology

By the time of the Achaemenid Empire, the term pairidaēza (Avestan) referred to extensive gardens built all over the empire. It derived from Proto-Iranian paridaiźa, literally meaning "circular boundary". Modern Persian ferdows and pardis are derivatives of the same word, which occurred in Greek as parádeisos and entered English as paradise.

According to the Oxford English Dictionary, as well as the Dehkhoda Dictionary, this word entered Hebrew as pardēs, following the arrival of the Jews in Babylon in the 5th century BC. In the sections of the Old Testament that predate this arrival, the notions of "heaven" and "hell" are not specific; only later has pārdēs, originally meaning "garden" and "orchard", been endowed with the spiritual meaning that is signified by this word.

Dehkhoda notes that pardēs has been used as a synonym for the Hebrew word gān, meaning "the Garden of Eden". He also states that the word firdaws, used twice in the Quran, has its root in Judaism and Christianity.

History
The origin of complex dates back to the reign of Mohammad Shah (1808–1848) of the Qajar dynasty, who ordered the construction of a mansion named Mohammadie in Tajrish. He died in September 1848, and the unfinished structure was subsequently disused.

Later on, Hossein Ali Khan (Moayyer ol Mamalek), a courtier close to Mohammad Shah, followed up the construction of a two-floor Qajar-style mansion within the same area. During the reign of Naser ed Din Shah (1848–1896), the ownership of the enclosure was transferred to Dust-Ali Khan (Nezam od Dowle), the son of Hossein Ali Khan. He refurbished the complex and renamed it Ferdows. Afterwards, Dust-Mohammad Khan, the son of Dust-Ali Khan and the son-in-law of Naser ed Din Shah, built a new mansion to the south of the enclosure. He used the workmanship of architects from Isfahan and Yazd, and named it Rašk e Behešt, meaning "the Envy of Heaven".

The complex changed several hands, and the older mansion was eventually destroyed. The remaining structure was then bought by Mohammad-Vali Khan Tonekaboni, who was the leader of the Constitutionalist Revolutionary Forces from Iran's northern regions of Gilan and Mazandaran. He added new pools and fountains to the complex, and regenerated the aqueduct that, in earlier years, had fed the garden with fresh water. The current gate of the garden also dates from this time.

The complex was leased to various ministries over years. In 1937, the Ministry of Education housed the primary and secondary school of Shapur in this compound. After the 1979 Revolution, until 2002, Ferdows Garden served as a training center for filmmaking. Since 2002, it houses the Cinema Museum.

In Iranian cinema
Ferdows Garden, 5 o'Clock in the Afternoon (2005), an Iranian film written, produced and directed by Siamak Shayeghi, with Reza Kianian, Ladan Mostofi and Azita Hajian in the principal roles, refers to the public park from where the main mansion is in view.

Gallery

See also

 Persian gardens
 Paradise garden
 Bagh (garden)
 Cinema of Iran

References

External links
 Official website of the Cinema Museum of Iran
 Slide show of the Cinema Museum of Iran
 Ferdows Garden on Flickr
 Sean Penn Visits the Cinema Museum of Iran

Museums in Tehran
Palaces in Tehran
Persian gardens in Iran
Persian words and phrases
Cinema museums
Palaces in Iran